Robert M. Johnson (born July 14, 1945), former publisher of Newsday, is now better-known as one of the most prominent men so far accused of child pornography offenses. On August 4, 2006, he pleaded guilty in the United States District Court for the Southern District of New York to one count of possession of child pornography and one count of destroying computer records, and was sentenced to fifteen months in federal prison on December 15, 2006. In 2004, citing personal reasons, he resigned as CEO of the financial information and document management firm Bowne & Co, as well as from his position as a member of the New York State Board of Regents.

The present article is concerned with Johnson's Newsday years, when he played a leading role in Long Island's governmental and environmental affairs, not only overtly as a dynamic public figure and an activist publisher, but also behind the scenes, particularly in his role as an influential board member of the Long Island Association.

Newsday publisher 1986–1994 

Johnson served as publisher of Newsday during a difficult and eventful period in the Long Island daily newspaper's history, from 1986 to November 1994. During his tenure, Newsday made the transition to full-color printing, and tried to maintain a New York City edition. Johnson was responsible for Newsday's wholesale hiring of top journalists away from the city's other dailies; at one point its roster of columnists and critics was arguably the most prestigious in the United States.

While at Newsday, Johnson was also the driving force behind a series of ill-fated campaigns to try to promote economic growth on Long Island, and to reduce the political influence of environmentalists and local civic associations, which he regarded as obstructionist. (See, e.g., Urban Development Corporation section on "The Long Island Partnership".) His close relationship with the noted developer Wilbur Breslin raised some eyebrows, particularly when the two men travelled together to Washington to lobby for relaxation of real estate lending regulations, which had become much stricter following the Saving and Loan debacle.

Also controversial was Johnson's collaboration with Howard J. Rubenstein's public relations firm, which was then engaged in composing attacks on environmentalists on behalf of a coalition of Long Island real estate developers and construction labor union leaders, several of whom were indicted for homicide. (See Note 1 below.)

Prior to Johnson's arrival on the scene, Newsday had a hard-earned national reputation for its relentless investigations of criminal corruption. Then the legendary reporters Bob Greene and Tom Renner were sidelined, one by a family tragedy and the other by cancer. Soon after Greene went into semi-retirement and Renner died, Newsday's investigative teams were quietly decommissioned. (See Note 2) The announcement of Johnson's appointment as Publisher had specified that he "will be responsible for its daily operations, including the news department and editorial policy."

Biography 

The following is a reduced version of a biography formerly displayed on the New York State Board of Regents website.

Robert M. Johnson, of Huntington, Long Island, New York was elected to a five-year term as the Regent for the Tenth District (Nassau and Suffolk Counties) effective April 1, 1995, and re-elected to serve through March 31, 2005.

Born in Joliet, Illinois, Johnson attended Lockport Central High School. He graduated from Louisiana State University in Baton Rouge, in 1968, majoring in Business Finance and Management. He received a Juris Doctor degree in 1971 from the University of Michigan Law School in Ann Arbor, Michigan. He has also received an Honorary Doctor of Laws degree from St. John's University, an Honorary Doctor of Humane Letters degree from Hofstra University, and an Honorary Doctor of Science degree from Dowling College.

Johnson was admitted to the Bar in Illinois and Washington, D.C. and joined the firm Seyfarth, Shaw, Fairweather and Geraldson, specializing in representation of the media. He became a partner in 1976 and left the firm to become Vice-President and General Manager of the Dispatch Printing Company of Columbus, Ohio in 1978. He was recruited to join Newsday as President and Chief Operating Officer in 1982 and was promoted to Publisher and Chief Executive Officer in 1986, a position he held until he resigned in November 1994. (See Note 3, below.) During his nine years as Newsday's Publisher, the paper expanded into New York City, grew from the ninth to the fifth largest newspaper in the U.S., became the largest selling paper in the New York metropolitan area, and won seven Pulitzer Prizes. Regent Johnson later served as the Chairman and CEO of Bowne & Co., Inc., an international leader in supporting the information and document management needs of the financial services industry, headquartered in Manhattan.

After moving to Long Island in 1982, Johnson served as a Director of the New York State Business Council, the Long Island Association, and currently serves as a director of the New York City Partnership. He also has served as a director of the Long Island Philharmonic, the New York Blood Center, the Brooklyn Academy of Music, the South Street Seaport Museum, the Advertising Council, the Audit Bureau of Circulations, and Hofstra University. The Johnsons have a daughter, now a teacher, and a son, both graduates of the public school system in New York State.

In 2000, Mr. Johnson received The Hundred Year Association of New York's Gold Medal Award "in recognition of outstanding contributions to the City of New York."

Notes 

Note 1. Newsday and the Construction Lobby in the Johnson Era: For a general overview of the membership and methodology of the "Business-Labor Coalition" editorially endorsed by Newsday circa 1989-91, see the hard-to-find and unindexed 1990 report of the New York State Organized Crime Task Force et al., Corruption and Racketeering in the New York City Construction Industry: Final Report to Governor Mario M. Cuomo. New York, NY: New York University Press. Although the title refers to New York City, the report also covers organizations and events on Long Island.

Starting in the late 1980s, Howard J. Rubenstein Associates provided public relations services for the Association for a Better Long Island and for labor unions belonging to the Building Trades Council of Nassau and Suffolk. The latter's fifty-plus member groups include Long Island locals of the Teamsters (Local 282 and others), Carpenters, Laborers, Ironworkers, Electrical Workers, Painters,  Steamfitters, and many other construction unions.The language in the quotes attributed to Rubenstein's clients in his firm's press releases bore an uncanny resemblance to the language of Newsday editorials at the time, particularly in their intemperate denunciations of "NIMBY"civic group leaders. Members of both ABLI and the BTC appear prominently, and often, in news stories and government reports on organized crime activity in New York City and Long Island. ABLI members sometimes show up as semi-victims, as when the Racanellis are shown reluctantly cooperating with mob extortion. But they also appear as spokesmen and promoters for Mob business interests, as when Wilbur Breslin's attorney Herb Balin was previously working for the notorious John Cody of Local 282.</ref>

To be fair, most of the murder charges against members of ABLI and the BTC tend to be dropped, and the rare convictions are often overturned. This is perhaps a tribute to the skills of their usual criminal attorney, Stephen Scaring, who is now a member of Robert M. Johnson's defense team. In some cases, charges are never brought in the first place, as when union leaders opposing corruption are murdered (e.g., an Ironworkers official named Leone shot down in his front yard following the release from prison of other officials from the same union, a Carpenters candidate for leadership of a local found dead on the union office floor). Biographies and trial transcripts of Mafia bosses often mention the union locals they've been involved with, and in the New York area these generally include BTC-affiliated locals. A murder case involving an ABLI board member concerned the death of a construction foreman who preferred to work with a non-Mafia cement supplier; in that case, the developer's chauffeur was convicted, the cement connection was ruled a coincidence, and the accused developer served a brief jail term for the charge of trying to cover up evidence. (See Discussion page accompanying this article.)

During Johnson's years at the helm of Newsday, the ABLI-BTC "Business-Labor Coalition" was promoted in editorials as a movement to save Long Island from the stranglehold of "NIMBY" environmental groups and civic associations. During this time, the "Coalition" engaged directly in political campaigns  (see 1989 Newsday archived articles on Suffolk Legislators Blass and Prospect). In early August 1991, a Carpenters- led demonstration to promote construction of "WillyWorld" climaxed in an occupation of Brookhaven Town Hall; that night, the BTC's friends in the Suffolk County Police physically prevented members of the public (including local Suffolk Legislator Nora Bredes) from attending the town's public hearing on "WillyWorld". Newsday's coverage of this extraordinary event was blandly uninformative;  the pertinent facts were barely mentioned, and then only in a subjective column by Paul Vitello a day after the main story.

Note 2. Investigative Team Decommissioned. For a while after the departure of Greene and Renner, Newsday continued to publish occasional major investigations into mob-related corruption in the construction industry. During 1991, the Long Island Business Journal, a small monthly published in Westhampton by Sheahan Communications, reported in a brief gossipy item that the Association for a Better Long Island was deeply displeased with on-going "business-bashing" in the pages of Newsday, and considering an advertising boycott or the creation of a competing newspaper. A later issue had an even briefer follow-up, indicating that they had met with Johnson and resolved their differences. Coincidentally or not, this coincided with the end of Newsday's rigorous scrutiny of Mob-infested businesses. It's also possible they could have been referring to the scrupulously objective in-depth stories by star business reporter Greg Steinmetz, but he may have already left for the Wall Street Journal by the time of Johnson's negotiations with the ABLI.

Note 3. Resignation from Newsday. Johnson's resignation was reported at the time (in Newsday, the New York Times, and local business publications) as involuntary, following a long and stormy meeting with his Times-Mirror bosses. The contents of the discussion were not made public.

Immediately following his ouster, Johnson was hired for an undisclosed sum to work as a consultant for Wilbur Breslin.

References

American newspaper executives
People from Long Island
University of Michigan Law School alumni
Louisiana State University alumni
People from Joliet, Illinois
Living people
1945 births
Journalists from Illinois